Julian Sidi Limehouse III (born December 17, 1938) was an American politician in the state of South Carolina. He served in the South Carolina House of Representatives from 1967 to 1968 and 1971 to 1972, representing Charleston County, South Carolina. He was arrested for trafficking marijuana from South America. He now works as a produce broker at a wholesale vegetable market, and as a farmer at Rosebank Farms Johns Island, South Carolina.  In 1972, he ran for Congress against Mendel Davis in South Carolina's 1st congressional district.

References

1941 births
Living people
People from Johns Island, South Carolina
Members of the South Carolina House of Representatives
Politicians from Charleston, South Carolina